Events from the year 1616 in Sweden

Incumbents
 Monarch – Gustaf II Adolf

Events

 - Armistice between Sweden and Russia. 
 - Johannes Messenius is imprisoned for treason.

Births

 - Gustaf Gustafsson af Wasaborg, illegitimate son of the monarch  (died 1653) 
 - Christina Magdalena of the Palatinate-Zweibrücken, princess  (died 1662)

Deaths

References

 
Years of the 17th century in Sweden
Sweden